Holkerveen is a hamlet in the Dutch province of Gelderland. It is a part of the municipality of Nijkerk and lies about six kilometers northeast of Amersfoort.

It was first mentioned in 1994 as Holkerveen, and means bog near Holk. The hamlet started in the 19th century as a peat colony. The postal authorities have placed it under Nijkerkerveen.

References

Populated places in Gelderland
Nijkerk